Mark Beretta  (born 16 June 1966) is an Australian journalist, best known as a sports reporter on Seven Network program Sunrise.

In July 2008, Beretta began presenting Seven Early News sport alongside Natalie Barr at 5.30 am, which leads into Sunrise, where he is still the sports presenter. Beretta joined with Tom Williams to host Rexona Australia's Greatest Athlete, in 2010. In 2011, he again hosted the show, this time alongside dual international Wendell Sailor.

Sunrise
Mark Beretta formerly co-hosted Sunrise with current Nine News presenter Georgie Gardner from 2000 to 2002. From mid-2002 to 2004, he moved to presenting the sport on Seven News in Sydney. At the end of 2003, it was announced that Seven had poached Sports Tonight presenter Matt White to join their refreshed 6pm lineup in Sydney for sport in the new year. Without a designated role, Beretta was asked to fill-in for Kochie on Sunrise for a few weeks in early 2004. Soon after, he became a 'Sunrise regular' during sports chats a few times a week. By August 2004, he was appointed as permanent sport presenter.

Beretta hosted the coverage of the 1998 Nagano, 2000 Sydney and 2002 Salt Lake City Olympic Games, as well as the 2002 Manchester Commonwealth Games.

In 2006, Beretta was the host of Seven Network's quiz show, The Master, which originally ran on Wednesday nights at 8:30 pm (later moved to Monday nights at 7:30 pm during the non-ratings season).

From 2007 until 2014, Beretta was part of the Seven Network's V8 Supercar commentary team, working alongside Matthew White, Neil Crompton, Mark Skaife and Mark Larkham. Beretta returned to commentary in 2021 when Seven resumed coverage of the championship from previous broadcaster Network 10.

Beretta is also a fill in presenter on The Morning Show and Weekend Sunrise, and a fill-in sport presenter on Seven News in Sydney. In 2013, Beretta hosted Seven's coverage of the Australian Open.

Publication
In October 2010, Beretta released his book The Riders - Australia's Motorcycle Champions through publisher HarperCollins. The Riders offers an insider's view of the world of motorcycle racing, with a collection of stories on 24 of Australia's greatest motorbike champions.

Personal life
Beretta is married and has two children.

Since 2010 he has regularly taken part in the  Tour de Cure bike ride from Sydney to Mooloolaba over ten days, to raise money to help find a cure for cancer. In 2011, he was appointed to the board of Tour De Cure.

In 2019 he joined the Australian Army Reserves.

Recognition and awards
Beretta was awarded the Medal of the Order of Australia in the 2021 Queen's Birthday Honours, for "service to the community through charitable organisations".

References

External links
Elite Sports profile

1966 births
Australian sports broadcasters
Seven News presenters
Living people
Australian people of Italian descent
Journalists from Sydney
People from Geelong
Motorsport announcers
Recipients of the Medal of the Order of Australia
Swinburne University of Technology alumni